Fatma Şebsefa Kadın ("one who abstain" and "night pleasure";   1766 –  1805) was a consort of Sultan Abdul Hamid I of the Ottoman Empire.

As imperial consort
Fatma Şebsefa Kadın was placed in the harem of Abdul Hamid, and was given the title of "Altıncı Kadın", "Sixth Consort". She was  called also Şebsafa, Şebisafa or Şebisafa Kadin. On 20 September 1782, she gave birth to her first child, a son, Şehzade Sultan Mehmed Nusret, who died at the age of three on 23 October 1785.

Two years later on 11 October 1784, she gave birth to her second child, a daughter, Alemşah Sultan, who died at the age of one, on 10 March 1786. Three years later on 4 February 1788, she gave birth to her third child, a daughter, Emine Sultan, who died at the age of about three on 9 March 1791.

In 1788, Şebsefa became pregnant with her fourth child. In January 1789, Captain David G. Sutherland noted following about her:

On 16 March 1789, she gave birth to a daughter, Hibetullah Sultan. She was widowed after Abdul Hamid's death a month later, after which she settled in the Old Palace.

Properties
In 1798, Şebsefa acquired the Depecik çiftlık of Cihanzade Hüseyin
Bey in Aydın Güzelhisar for 33,500 kuruş, and also owned agricultural land in the vicinity of Thessaloniki, apart from a pension out of the funds of the Istanbul customs. After her death, all the çiftlıks were assigned to her daughter Hibetullah Sultan.

Charities

Şebsefa is noted for the foundation bearing her name in the Istanbul area of Zeyrek, established in 1787 according to the inscription over the entrance to the mosque. Originally built on different levels, the foundation consists of mosque, primary school and fountain, along with the grave of the foundress. An endowment, dated 1805, specifies that the school was also to be open to girls, a provision which has earned Şebsefa the reputation of a pioneer in Ottoman female education. She contrived the mosque in the memory of her son Şehzade Mehmed Nusret who died as a child.

Death
Şebsefa Kadın died in 1805, and was buried in her own mosque located in Zeyrek, Istanbul.

Issue
Together with Abdul Hamid, Şebsefa had four children, a son and three daughters:
Şehzade Mehmed Nusret (20 September 1782 – 23 October 1785, buried in Tomb of Abdul Hamid I);
Alemşah Sultan (11 October 1784 – 10 March 1786, buried in Tomb of Abdul Hamid I);
Emine Sultan (4 February 1788 – 9 March 1791, buried in Tomb of Abdul Hamid I);
 Hibetullah Sultan (16 March 1789 – 18 September 1841, buried in Tomb of Mahmud II), married 3 February 1803 her cousin Sultanzade Alaeddin Pasha (died at Scutari, January 1812), son of Hatice Sultan and Seyid Ahmed Pasha;

See also
Kadın (title)
Ottoman Imperial Harem
List of consorts of the Ottoman sultans

References

Sources

18th-century consorts of Ottoman sultans
1766 births
1805 deaths
Ottoman Sunni Muslims
19th-century consorts of Ottoman sultans